Dieter Meinel (born 28 December 1949) is a former East Germany cross-country skier who competed in the 1970s. He earned a gold  medal in the 4 x 10 km at the 1974 FIS Nordic World Ski Championships in Falun.
His best olympic finish was 33rd twice in the 30 km and 50 km events in the 1976 Winter Olympics in Innsbruck.

External links
World Championship results 

German male cross-country skiers
Living people
1949 births
Olympic cross-country skiers of East Germany
Cross-country skiers at the 1976 Winter Olympics
FIS Nordic World Ski Championships medalists in cross-country skiing
People from Klingenthal
Sportspeople from Saxony